Major Ernest Everard Gates (29 May 1903 – 12 October 1984) was a British Conservative Party politician. He was a Member of Parliament (MP) for the Middleton and Prestwich constituency in Lancashire from 1940 until he stood down at the 1951 general election.

He won the seat a by-election in May 1940, at which his only opponent was a  member of the British Union of Fascists. Gates's 98.7% share of the votes remains an all-time record for any Parliamentary by-election in the United Kingdom.

References

External links 
 

1903 births
1984 deaths
Conservative Party (UK) MPs for English constituencies
UK MPs 1935–1945
UK MPs 1945–1950
UK MPs 1950–1951